Toby is the surname of:

 Allira Toby, Australian footballer
 Arthur Toby (1903-1984), Australian rugby union and rugby league player
 Darren Toby (born 1982), Trinidadian footballer in the United States
 Frederick Toby (1888-1963), Australian cricketer
 Gabriel Toby, Nigerian politician and economist,  Deputy Governor of Rivers State from 1999 to 2007
 Joseph Toby (born 1989), Sierra Leonean-American soccer player
 Ronald Toby (born 1942), American historian, academic, writer and Japanologist
 Ryan Toby (born 1978), American soul singer, songwriter, producer and actor

See also
 Tobey, another surname